Livonia Center is a hamlet and census-designated place (CDP) in the town of Livonia, Livingston County, New York, United States. Its population was 421 as of the 2010 census. Livonia Center has a post office with ZIP code 14488, which opened on April 9, 1811.

Geography
Livonia Center is in northeastern Livingston County, slightly north of the geographic center of the town of Livonia. U.S. Route 20A passes through the community, leading west  to the village of Livonia and southeast  to Hemlock.

The community is drained by Kinney Creek, a southeast-flowing tributary of Hemlock Outlet and part of the Genesee River watershed.

Demographics

References

Hamlets in Livingston County, New York
Hamlets in New York (state)
Census-designated places in Livingston County, New York
Census-designated places in New York (state)